The Bagatela Theatre in Kraków is situated at the junction of Karmelicka Street and Krupniczej Street. The theatre's intimate "new stage" is located on Sarego Józefa Street.

History
The theatre's history dates back to 1918, when Marian Dąbrowski, publisher and editor of Kraków's "Ilustrowany Kurier Codzienny" (English: Illustrated Daily Courier, commonly known as IKC, also Ikac) initiated the creation of the stage. The building was designed by architect Janusz Zarzecki during 1918 - 1919, and its interior was designed by painter and decorator Henry Uziembło. In 1926, due to financial difficulties and increase in the popularity of the cinema, the theatre was reclassified as a cinema. A fire that broke out the night of 6/7 April 1928 completely destroyed the interior.  In 1938, the building was modernized and renamed "Scala". It became the most elegant cinema in Kraków. Housed here during 1946 - 1948 was an intimate theatre. Since 1949 it has been home to the Państwowy Teatr Młodego Widza (English: State Theatre of the Young Viewer). The Rozmaitości Theatre was established here in 1957. The theatre returned to being called Bagatela in 1970, and was dedicated to the memory of Tadeusz Boy-Żeleński in 1972.  The writer and doctor lived in a flat in the area for many years.

Roman Polanski made his debut here as a young man.  The theatre was originally designed for children but nowadays shows musicals, comedies and other light entertainments suitable for families.

Actors 
 Krzysztof Bochenek
 Jakub Bohosiewicz
 Przemysław Branny
 Urszula Grabowska
 Aleksandra Godlewska
 Agnieszka Grochowicz
 Marcin Kobierski
 Alina Kamińska
 Alicja Kobielska
 Grzegorz Kliś
 Tomasz Kot
 Anna Krakowiak
 Wojciech Leonowicz
 Marek Litewka
 Katarzyna Litwin
 Ewa Mitoń
 Tomasz Obara
 Małgorzata Piskorz
 Piotr Różanski
 Sławomir Sośnierz
 Dariusz Starczewski
 Ewelina Starejki
 Przemysław Tejkowski
 Dariusz Toczek
 Magdalena Walach
 Juliusz Krzysztof Warunek
 Witold Surówka
 Krystyna Stankiewicz

References

External links 
 Bagatela Theatre Official Web site (PL)
 Bagatela Theatre Profile, Public Information Bulletin for the City of Kraków (PL)

Theatres completed in 1918
1918 establishments in Poland
Theatres in Kraków